Jimmy Daywalt (August 28, 1924 – April 4, 1966) was an American racecar driver.

Born in Wabash, Indiana, he drove in the AAA and USAC Championship Car series, racing in the 1950, 1953–1957, 1959, and 1961–1962 seasons with 20 starts. He finished in the top ten 3 times. His best finish was in the 1953 Indianapolis 500, where he finished 6th and was named Rookie of the Year.

Daywalt died of cancer in Indianapolis, Indiana, aged 41. He is interred at Crown Hill Cemetery in Indianapolis.

Indy 500 results

Complete Formula One World Championship results
(key)

References

External links
 Profile on Historic Racing

1924 births
1966 deaths
Indianapolis 500 drivers
Indianapolis 500 Rookies of the Year
People from Wabash, Indiana
Deaths from cancer in Indiana
Racing drivers from Indianapolis
Burials at Crown Hill Cemetery